Edward John McDermott (October 29, 1852 – May 1, 1926) was an American politician, who served as the 31st Lieutenant Governor of Kentucky from 1911 to 1915, under Governor James B. McCreary. At the time, this was the highest political post ever achieved by a Catholic in Kentucky.

References

Bibliography
 
 

1852 births
1926 deaths
Harvard University alumni
Kentucky lawyers
Lieutenant Governors of Kentucky
Democratic Party members of the Kentucky House of Representatives
Politicians from Louisville, Kentucky
Catholics from Kentucky
19th-century American lawyers